Dr. Sudhanshu Trivedi (born 20 October 1970) is an Indian politician. A leader of Bharatiya Janata Party and Member of Parliament from Upper House Rajya Sabha, Trivedi is serving as the Senior National Spokesperson of Bharatiya Janata Party.

Career 

Trivedi had done masters in Mechanical Engineering and had served as a faculty in Mechanical Engineering department in a couple of Indian Universities including Mahatma Gandhi Chitrakoot Gramoday Vishwavidyalaya. He also worked as Information Advisor to the former Chief Minister, Uttar Pradesh and also Political Advisor to former BJP National President Rajnath Singh.

He is an ardent speaker on the issues of India's National Policy, Society and particularly the Ideological aspects of Bharatiya Janata Party.

Trivedi hails from Lucknow, Uttar Pradesh. He studied Engineering and holds a Ph.D. in Mechanical Engineering from Dr. A.P.J. Abdul Kalam Technical University (previously U.P. Technical University), Lucknow, Uttar Pradesh.

He played a role in the 2014 Indian General Elections. He was one of the members of a core team of Media and Communications.
In 2019 Lok Sabha election, he was co-incharge for BJP Rajasthan along with Member of Media and Literature Committee. Presently, he is the National Spokesperson of the BJP.

References

Living people
Bharatiya Janata Party politicians from Uttar Pradesh
Rajya Sabha members from Uttar Pradesh
1975 births